The Jianxing Formation is located in Suiling County, Heilongjiang Province and is composed of basal conglomerate, gravel-bearing coarse-grained sandstone, with interbeds of siltstone, mudstone and coal seams. The Jianxing Formation has been dated to the Early Cretaceous period.

References

Lower Cretaceous Series of Asia
Geology of Heilongjiang
Geologic formations of China